Filipino refugees are persons originating from the country of the Philippines. Following the Moro conflict and subsequent major military operation in the islands of Mindanao during the administration of President Ferdinand Marcos in 1970s, thousands of Filipinos mainly from the Moro ancestry have sought refuge in neighbouring countries of Malaysia, Indonesia and Brunei, with majority of them mostly heading to the state of Sabah in Malaysia.

Reasons for fleeing 

Despite the uncertain conflict that happened in the southern Philippines, many of the Filipinos decision to flee are also driven by economic factors and hope for a better lives with many are reluctant to return to their homeland that continues to be torn by violence and kidnappings.

Host countries

Malaysia 

Since the 1970s, thousands of Filipino refugees have emigrated to the state of Sabah, forcing the need for maintenance of the refugees. As Malaysia are not the signatory of the 1951 UN Refugee Convention, the country have maintained that any newly arrived aliens are illegal immigrants rather than refugees. Although unlike the economically motivated illegal immigrants, the Filipino refugees have long been granted special permission to stay despite limited access to the state employment, social services and public amenities.

The United Nations High Commission for Refugees (UNHCR) establish its office in the state in 1977 with around $2.7 million have been allocated for the maintenance of the refugees children education, with most of it been allocated to the Sandakan area. Despite this however, the Philippines side constantly accused the Malaysian side especially the Sabah authorities for victimising the refugees with the dismissal of their workers by Sabah businessmen.

The total of Filipino refugees was only 20,367 in the first quarter of 1970. By 1978, it increased to over 92,000 with a non-official estimate put the total already reach 140,000. The refugees rose to over 350,000 in 1989. As there is still no definite sign the conflict will permanently stopped, the influx of Filipino refugees continued even after the peace agreement with the Moro National Liberation Front (MNLF) in 1976.

Following the government decision to issue residency visas and a special card known as the IMM13 to the refugees, the UNHCR closed its office in 1987 after operating for 10 years. To this date, the main office being maintained in Kuala Lumpur.

Indonesia 
As there is no official estimate of the total of Filipino refugees in Indonesia, the exact population is unknown. Recent findings in 2014 found there are at least 544 Filipino refugees (mostly from the Bajau community) taking shelter in Derawan Island, Berau Regency, East Kalimantan. It is believed their presence began in 2010 with some of the refugees claiming they are Malaysian citizens, although they were found with a special document released by the Malaysian government which stating they are not the citizen of that country during identity check-up by the Indonesian authorities. Responding to the report, Indonesian President Joko Widodo ordering them to be sent back to their country in the Philippines immediately, although it is still unknown whether the process of deportation has begun. Nunukan Regency in North Kalimantan also reportedly saw a large Filipino refugees presence as recently in early 2017.

Aid

Issues 
The UNHCR office in the Malaysian state of Sabah have been giving aid to the refugees for a period of 10 years; however, following the closure of its office, many of the refugees have been roaming in and around Sabah. Following the release of report from Royal Commission of Inquiry on illegal immigrants in Sabah (RCI) which stated many of the Filipino refugees have illegally obtained Malaysian citizenship, the UNHCR began monitoring the situation. However, since the UNHCR did not have any permanent presence in the state anymore, the monitoring capacity was limited.

As the Philippines never have the intention to establish its own consulate in the Malaysian state of Sabah to look on the welfare of its citizens, the blame was also put to the Philippines side for its lack of co-operation as the country continuously criticising the treatment towards its refugees without giving more of its own efforts to help and solve the problems of its own citizens.

By the end of 2014, UNHCR Malaysia together with UNICEF plans to support local non-governmental organisations (NGOs) to conduct a workshop on birth registration which will be involving different government agencies; such as the Malaysian National Registration Department, local legal practitioners as well as relevant stakeholders. Filipino refugees children also have been enrolled to recently established Alternative Learning Centre (ALC) that was set-up by Filipino volunteers in Sabah with a collaboration with various local NGOs.

By 2016, under the Philippines administration reform of President Rodrigo Duterte, the Philippine government began to sign a deal with the Malaysian government for the gradual repatriation of Filipino refugees in Sabah. The Philippines side also announced their plan to establish a consular office in the state along with the establishment of their own school and hospital to care for their nationals as had been recommended previously. However, according to Philippine Representative from Palawan Jose C. Alvarez, they are more interested to establish a Palawan Business Office in the state than Philippine Office that will also giving the similar services like passport granting, renewal of travel documents and other requirements as well extending business assistance to the Filipino people when the need arises, giving excuses that it is only proper and logical to set up the main office if there are increasing number of Filipino traders especially from Palawan.

The Filipinos in the state expressed their hopes that more attention will be given from the Filipino consular services especially on easy and better access in communication facilities, more friendly attitude from embassy officials and staff and transparency in all official transactions as they had repeatedly expressed their dissatisfaction over how the manner of consular missions were conducted with the presence of "middlemen", delays in deliveries of travel documents, difficulties to telephone the main Philippine embassy in Kuala Lumpur and rudeness of some of the embassy officials and staff.

Durable solution

Repatriation 

The Malaysian government are criticised for its contrast policy in dealing with refugees; with different treatments have been compared between the non-Muslim Vietnamese refugees which are quickly being repatriated than the Muslim Filipino refugees which are still being maintained in the country until this day. In defending the presence of Filipino refugees, Ghazali Shafie who is the Home Minister at the time justified their position with the support of Deputy Prime Minister Mahathir Mohamad:

Their presence will not have adverse effects on the peace and order of the country because they intended to go back whereas the presence of Vietnamese immigrants could have adverse consequences on the country as they had no intention of returning to their homeland after the war.

Ghazali Shafie, Malaysian Home Minister.

Most of the Filipino refugees are issued with IMM13 documents by the Malaysian government during Mahathir administration, with many of them have been controversially naturalised as citizen.

Repatriation of Filipino refugees remain difficult due to the ongoing conflict in the southern Philippines. The latest peace deal between the Government of the Philippines and Moro Islamic Liberation Front (MILF) is a step towards peace and stability in the southern Philippines. The MILF have been welcoming the return of Filipino refugees from Malaysia as the peace is being gradually restored in their homeland. The International Monitoring Team (IMT) led by Malaysia also monitoring the ceasefire between the Philippine government and MILF since 2010 and put hopes that further new administration of the Philippine government will put an end to the refugee issues which have plaguing the bilateral relations between the two countries.

Group such as the MNLF under Nur Misuari have recently staging violent attacks to oppose the peace agreement between the MILF and the Philippine government forces with the latest major attack resulted in the Zamboanga City crisis in late 2013. This presents a definite obstacle to repatriation and led to another new wave of refugees.

Hosting refugees 

There are at least five camps for the Filipino refugees in Malaysia, such as in Kinarut in Papar, Telipok in Kota Kinabalu, Kampung Bahagia in Sandakan, Kampung Selamat in Semporna and Kampung Hidayat in Tawau with many Sabah local politicians have repeatedly urging the closure of the camps and repatriation of the refugees to their home country as the camps have become the source of many criminal activities perpetrated by the refugees.

In late 2016, the Sabah state government submit recommendations to the Malaysian federal government through the Main Committee on Management of Foreigners to move all the refugee placement schemes in the state to other more suitable locations far from the towns and industrial development areas. Further in 2019 under a new Malaysian government, the IMM13 document for refugees from southern Philippines are being replaced with Temporary Sabah Pass (PSS) to solve the problems once and for all which have been ongoing since 1970s where the old document is misused by the refugees which subsequently posing threats to the security of the state.

Criticism of refugee settlements 
The huge Filipino refugee settlements in Sabah have mainly criticised by the locals there for contributing to the significant rise of rampant crimes, with the refugees loyalty towards the country they seeking for refuge are also been questioned for the unstoppable crimes perpetrated from their own community as a Filipino man was recently charged in court as recently in 2017 for supporting the ideology of Abu Sayyaf terrorist group.

Criticism of Malaysia 
Part of the reason why there are Filipino Moro refugees in Malaysia is that they were fleeing the war and violence that destroyed their homes in Sulu and Mindanao, a violence arising out of the Moro conflict, an insurgency against the Philippine government which Malaysia publicly supported until the year 2001. This was done to counter-act reconquest attempts by the Philippine centered Sultanate of Sulu, which used to rule Sabah, before sovereignty was transferred to Malaysia. Malaysia is criticized for being responsible for the war in the Philippines yet refuse to host refugees from the war they themselves caused. Filipino refugees also feel trapped as the Malaysian government refuse granting citizenship to many such refugees, classfying them as a stateless people.

See also 
 Filipinos in Malaysia
 Moro conflict
 Cross border attacks in Sabah
 Illegal immigrants in Malaysia

Notes

References 

Foreign relations of the Philippines
Filipino refugees
Refugees in Malaysia
Refugees in Indonesia
Refugees in Brunei